is an upcoming action-role playing video game developed by Team Ninja and published by Sony Interactive Entertainment for the PlayStation 5. The game is currently scheduled for release in 2024.

Gameplay
Rise of the Rōnin, similar to Team Ninja's previous efforts Wo Long: Fallen Dynasty and Nioh 2, lets you create a custom character. The combat features a wide array of weapons common during the Boshin war, such as katanas and various Boshin war firearms. The game also features story choices at key moments in the game, allowing you side or fight against various non-player characters, affecting the story.

Story
Set in Edo in the late 19th century during Bakumatsu, the final years of the Edo period, the game depicts the Boshin war between the Tokugawa Shogunate and various anti-shogunate factions displeased with the western influence after the reopening of Japan following the Sakoku period.

Development
Rise of the Rōnin was formally announced on September 13, 2022, at a State of Play livestream hosted by Sony. Development on the game started in 2015, with PlayStation Studios' XDev assissting. According to Team Ninja president Fumihiko Yasuda, they've wanted to create a game that depicts Japan in its darkest times, citing the Bakumatsu-period as an era video games would "shy away from". The game's setting would also lend itself well to their expertise, due to their experience making games focused on ninja and samurai, such as Ninja Gaiden and Nioh. According to Yasuda, Rise of the Rōnin is the most ambitious project Team Ninja has developed.

References
Translation

Citation

External links

Upcoming video games scheduled for 2024
Action role-playing video games
Action-adventure games
Edo period in fiction
Hack and slash games
Koei Tecmo games
Open-world video games
PlayStation 5 games
PlayStation 5-only games
Single-player video games
Sony Interactive Entertainment games
Team Ninja games
Video games about samurai
Video games based on real people
Video games developed in Japan
Video games set in Japan
Video games set in feudal Japan
War video games set in Asia